Naga is a fictional character appearing in American comic books published by Marvel Comics. Naga was created by writer Roy Thomas and artist Marie Severin and first appeared in Sub-Mariner #9 (January 1969).

Fictional character biography
Naga was a member of the water breathing humanoid race Homo mermanus which settled in Lemuria centuries after the continent was submerged during the Great Cataclysm. Approximately 600 years ago, Naga was the ruler of Lemuria when the Serpent Crown was discovered among the ruins of the old human built cities in the kingdom. Upon donning the helmet, Naga came under the influence of Set, a malevolent serpent god who was exiled in another dimension, but could use the Crown as a means to exert its malign influence on Earth.

Naga's physical appearance was changed from exposure to the crown; his facial features came to resemble those of a snake, and his skin became scale-like and green. As the Emperor, he converted the Lemurian people to the worship of Set, and he, satisfied with Naga, explained him how to grease the crown with some fish oils to stop his aging - however, this effect could not last if the Crown was not on Naga's head, allowing him to rule over his people for centuries. With time, even Naga's subjects, the Lemurians, began to share this features. Naga's use of the crown eventually came to an end hundreds of years later, when the rebel group Piscastos stole it from him as he slept. Without the Crown, Naga began to grow old. He formed a group of warriors, The Searchers, and sent them after the Crown, but they failed for decades. 

In more recent times, a half-Lemurian mutant called Llyra came to prominence in Lemuria, eventually becoming the high priestess of Set. Attempting to attain even more power for herself, Llyra manipulated the by now senile and possibly insane Naga into arranging her marriage to his oldest surviving son, Merro, wanting to became empress of Lemuria herself.  

After those events, the Serpent Crown re-emerged in another underwater city – Atlantis. Upon donning the Serpent Crown, Namor had a vision of Naga. Lemurian agents led by Karthon the Quester stole the Crown from Namor the Sub-Mariner and returned it to Naga in Lemuria, who immediately donned it and once again accessed its vast powers. Naga battled Namor in a Lemurian arena. During the resulting conflict that was caused by Namor's attempts to reclaim the Serpent Crown, Karthon assassinated Naga by a sword wound in the back. The Crown and Naga were cast into an undersea chasm and thought destroyed and dead.

A manifestation of Naga later briefly appeared when Hugh Jones, a human who wore the crown and fell under the influence of Set, conjured up "spirits" of the Crown's past wearers to do battle with the Scarlet Witch and the Thing.

Later, in the 1989 Atlantis Attacks crossover, when the Deviant Set worshiper Ghaur created a massive, new Serpent Crown, Naga's spirit returned again. Ghaur then attempted to take control of the power of the new Crown, but came into conflict with Naga's spirit, a conflict which caused Llyra and Ghaur to vanish.

Powers and abilities
Naga was a member of the evolutionary offshoot of the human race called Homo mermanus. As such, he had enhanced strength, gills enabling him to extract oxygen from water, durability against water pressure, and the ability to see in the dimly lit ocean depths.

For a time, Naga wore the Serpent Crown of Set, endowing him with mystical abilities, great longevity and vitality, with the ability to project energy blasts, fly, teleport himself, create illusions, and control the minds of others.

References

External links

Naga (Lemurian) (Earth-616) at Marvel Fandom

Comics characters introduced in 1969
Fictional characters with superhuman durability or invulnerability
Marvel Comics Atlanteans (Homo mermanus)
Marvel Comics characters who use magic
Marvel Comics characters with superhuman strength
Marvel Comics supervillains